Putilov may refer to 
Putilov (surname)
Putilov Stal-2 aircraft
Putilov Stal-3 aircraft
Putilov Stal-5 aircraft
Putilov Stal-11 aircraft
Garford-Putilov Armoured Car
The Putilov Strike of 1917 in Petrograd, Russia
Kirov Plant, previously known as Putilov Plant